HR 2554, also known as V415 Carinae and A Carinae, is an eclipsing spectroscopic binary of the Algol type in the constellation of Carina whose apparent visual magnitude varies by 0.06 magnitude and is approximately 4.39 at maximum brightness. Its primary is a G-type bright giant star and its secondary is an A-type main-sequence star. It is approximately 553 light-years from Earth.

HR 2554 A
The primary component, HR 2554 A, is a yellow G-type bright giant with a mean apparent magnitude of +4.4.

HR 2554 B
The secondary component, HR 2554 B, is a white A-type main-sequence dwarf, about three magnitudes fainter than the primary.

HR 2554 binary system

HR 2554 has two components in orbit around each other, making it a binary star. The semi-major axis of the secondary's orbit is 2.17 arcseconds. The two components regularly eclipse each other, making A Carinae a variable star. Its brightness varies by 0.06 magnitude with a period equal to its orbital period of 195 days.

References

Carina (constellation)
G-type bright giants
A-type main-sequence stars
Algol variables
Spectroscopic binaries
Carinae, A
050337
032761
2554
Carinae, V415
CD-53 01613